Saidu Sahid Fofanah (born 14 September 1997) is a Sierra Leonean professional footballer who plays as a midfielder for the Sierra Leonean club Kallon, and the Sierra Leone national team.

International career
Sesay made his international debut with the Sierra Leone national team in a 1–0 2021 Africa Cup of Nations qualification win over Benin on 15 June 2021. He was part of the Sierra Leone squad the 2021 Africa Cup of Nations.

References

External links
 
 

1997 births
Living people
Sierra Leonean footballers
Sierra Leone international footballers
Division 4 (Swedish football) players
Association football midfielders
2021 Africa Cup of Nations players
Sierra Leonean expatriate footballers
Sierra Leonean expatriate sportspeople in Sweden
Expatriate footballers in Sweden